Yallop is a surname. Notable people with the surname include:

 David Yallop (1937–2018), English writer
 Frank Yallop (b. 1964), English soccer player
 Graham Yallop (b. 1952), Australian cricketer
 John Yallop (b. 1949), British rower
 Kirsty Yallop (b. 1986), New Zealand soccer player
 Tameka Yallop (b. 1991), Australian soccer player
 Rachel Yallop, British artist